The 1940 All-Ireland Senior Football Championship Final was the 53rd All-Ireland Final and the deciding match of the 1940 All-Ireland Senior Football Championship, an inter-county Gaelic football tournament for the top teams in Ireland.

Match

Summary
Joe Duggan scored a goal for Galway just before half-time, but Kerry hit four points in the second half to secure a narrow victory. The game was plagued by fouls, sixty-two frees being awarded in all.

It was the first of three All-Ireland football titles won by Kerry in the 1940s.

It was also the first of three consecutive All-Ireland football finals lost by Galway.

With their 1940 win, Kerry reached 14 All-Ireland titles, drawing level with Dublin. Dublin had been in the lead since 1892. In 1941, Kerry would take the lead; Dublin equalled the new total in 1942 but never again managed to surpass Kerry's total.

Details

References

All-Ireland Senior Football Championship Final
All-Ireland Senior Football Championship Final, 1940
All-Ireland Senior Football Championship Finals
Galway county football team matches
Kerry county football team matches